

The Jurca MJ-14 Fourtouna was a racing aircraft designed by Marcel Jurca in France in the late 1970s. It was an unconventional, low-wing cantilever monoplane with retractable tailwheel undercarriage. The fuselage had a low profile that required the pilot to sit in a reclined position. The vertical stabiliser was very small, but aft of the cockpit, the fuselage changed shape from being low and broad to being high and narrow. None have been completed.

Specifications (as designed)

References
 
 
 Fourtouna on old version of manufacturer's website, archived at archive.org

1970s French sport aircraft
Homebuilt aircraft
Jurca aircraft
Low-wing aircraft